Xilang station, formerly Guanggang station because of nearby Guangzhou Iron and Steel's headquarters when planning, is a terminus of Line 1 of the Guangzhou Metro and Guangfo Line (FMetro Line 1). It started operations on 28 June 1997. It was situated at the underground of Huadi Avenue South in Fangcun, Liwan District.

During COVID-19 pandemic control rules from 29 May to 24 June 2021, services of Xilang station had been largely restricted, as all entrances and exits are closed, passengers can't embark or disembark at this station, and while the trains on both lines can still stop here, passengers can only transfer between both lines within the fare zone. The entrance has reopened in the afternoon of 24 June.

Station layout

Exits

References

Railway stations in China opened in 1997
Guangzhou Metro stations in Liwan District
Foshan Metro stations